The WDF Europe Cup is a darts tournament held biennially since 1978. The tournament consists of a team championship, a pairs championship and a singles championship. All events have a men's competition, and a women's competition (since 1982).

Tournament structure
The country achieving the highest total of points from all three events shall be crowned the WDF Europe Cup Champions. In the event of a tie for first place those countries shall be declared the Joint WDF Europe Cup Champions.

The WDF announced in early 2014 that a women's team (fours) event would be added to the schedule for the first time at the 2014 Europe Cup as well as future WDF Europe and World Cup tournaments. The most recent Europe Cup was held in 2018, in Budapest, Hungary.

Previous winners

References

External links
 Official site of 2010 Europe Cup
 WDF Official Website

1978 establishments in Europe
Darts tournaments